Wings Financial Credit Union is a not-for-profit, member-owned credit union headquartered in Apple Valley, Minnesota. With assets of $8.4 billion, the credit union serves eligible Minnesota and Wisconsin counties, the metro areas of Seattle/Tacoma, Detroit, Orlando, Atlanta and employees in the air transportation industry nationwide. Wings was chartered in 1938 and is regulated by the National Credit Union Administration (NCUA).

About the company
Wings provides financial services to the employees of more than 50 different airlines, many aviation support companies, and government agencies connected to the air transportation industry. Wings operates 33 branch offices around the country including branches in Atlanta, Orlando, Detroit, Minneapolis/St. Paul and Seattle. Wings Financial also offers an ATM network of over 80,000 surcharge-free ATMs coast-to-coast. The credit union offers financial products including savings, checking, loans, mortgages, and commercial services. Wings Financial is the largest credit union based in Minnesota and is among the country's 40 largest credit unions with over $8 billion in assets.

Company history
Wings Financial was founded in 1938 as the Northwest Airlines Employees Credit Union by a group of seven Northwest Airlines employees in St. Paul, Minnesota. Assets at the end of 1938 stood at $359. The credit union grew slowly and steadily over its first few years. Significant growth began after World War II as Northwest Airlines expanded across the country and across the Pacific. Between 1945 and 1949, the Credit Union grew nearly 500%, fueled by those returning from the war.

Subsequent years saw consistent growth from the credit union. The credit union passed $100 million in assets in 1984 and achieved the $500 million in 1997. In August 2001, the credit union passed $1 billion in assets. In 2004, the credit union expanded beyond Northwest Airlines and opened its doors to other employees in the air transportation industry in the United States. To reflect a changing membership, the name of the credit union was changed to Wings Financial Federal Credit Union.

Wings Financial has continued to grow and now has over $8.4 billion in assets.

In August 2009, members of Wings Financial voted to become a state-chartered credit union, extending membership to thirteen counties in the Minneapolis-Saint Paul area.

In 2010, Wings announced a merger with City-County Federal Credit Union of Minneapolis, doubling the number of branches it operated in the Minneapolis-St. Paul area and increasing its membership by 50%. The merger was finalized in 2011.

In 2014, Wings began a partnership with the Minnesota Zoo. As a part of this partnership, Wings is the namesake sponsor of the Wings Financial World of Birds Show.

In 2018, Wings purchased three branches of KleinBank. Under the deal 4,500 KleinBank customers will become Wings members.

In 2021, Wings acquired Brainerd Savings & Loan. The transaction added an additional Wings location in Brainerd, MN.

Membership
Membership is available to most people employed in, retired from, or whose job directly supports the air transportation of people or cargo, immediate family members of persons engaged in such activities, and family members (including household relationships) of a current credit union member.

In addition, those who live or work in eligible Minnesota or Wisconsin counties; or in the Seattle-Tacoma, WA metro area, the Detroit, MI, metro area, the Orlando, FL metro area, or the Atlanta, GA metro area as defined below are eligible for membership at Wings Financial.

Membership Eligibility Details:

Employees of airlines
Government employees who work directly in the administration, regulation, or security of airlines, airports, or air transportation
Employees who are located at an airport, if they work directly with: 
Air transportation of freight;
Air courier services;
Airport and air transportation support and services (for example: janitorial services, airport baggage handling, aircraft cleaning, maintenance and repair services, runway maintenance services and on board airline food services)
Eligible Minnesota or Wisconsin counties
Seattle-Tacoma, Washington Metro Area
Detroit, Michigan Metro Area
Orlando, Florida Metro Area
Atlanta, Georgia Metro Area
Members who are members of the Wings Financial Foundation

Once becoming a member, membership can be passed to family members.

Wings Financial Foundation 
The Wings Financial Foundation was founded in 2014 as a 501(c)(3) non-profit organization. The Foundation focuses its efforts on financial education, nutritional needs, and community impact.

References

External links

Credit unions based in Minnesota
Banks established in 1938
1938 establishments in Minnesota